The women's 3 km individual pursuit competition at the 2006 Asian Games was held on 10 and 11 December at the Aspire Hall 1.

Schedule
All times are Arabia Standard Time (UTC+03:00)

Records

Results

Qualifying

Finals

Bronze

Gold

References

External links 
Results

Track Women individual pursuit